Nohira (written: 野平) is a Japanese surname. Notable people with the surname include:

, Japanese table tennis player
, pen name of Shunpei Mizuno, Japanese academic and writer
, Japanese table tennis player

Japanese-language surnames